Guerra de Titanes (2019) (Spanish for "War of the Titans") was a professional wrestling event scripted and produced by the Lucha Libre AAA World Wide (AAA) promotion. The show took take place on December 14, 2019, in Madero, Tamaulipas, Mexico at the Domo Madero building and was the twenty-third Guerra de Titanes show promoted by AAA since 1997. It was the last AAA PPV event held before the start of the COVID-19 pandemic, which began in mid-March 2020.

In the main event Blue Demon Jr., Rey Escorpión and Rush El Toro Blanco defeated Psycho Clown, Dr. Wagner Jr., and Drago, after which Rush, Konnan, L.A. Park, Killer Kross, and La Bestia del Ring announced that they were the newest version of La Facción Ingobernable. On the undercard, Big Mami defeated Lady Maravilla in a Lucha de Apuestas, Hair vs. Hair match, after which Lady Maravilla was forced to have her hair shaved off. Lucha Brothers (Pentagón Jr. and Fénix) successfully defended the AAA World Tag Team Championship against Jinetes del Aire (El Hijo del Vikingo and Myzteziz Jr.) and Australian Suicide/Rey Horus.

Production

Background
Starting in 1997 the Mexican professional wrestling, company AAA has held a major wrestling show late in the year, either November or December, called Guerra de Titanes ("War of the Titans"). The show often features championship matches or Lucha de Apuestas or bet matches where the competitors risked their wrestling mask or hair on the outcome of the match. In Lucha Libre, the Lucha de Apuetas match is considered more prestigious than a championship match and many major shows feature one or more Apuesta matches. The Guerra de Titanes show is hosted in a new location each year, emanating from cities such as Madero, Chihuahua City, Mexico City, Guadalajara, Jalisco and others. In 2016, AAA moved the Guerra de Titanes show to January but in 2018 the show was held in December which continued with the 2019 event.

Storylines
Guerra de Titanes featured eight professional wrestling matches, with different wrestlers involved in pre-existing scripted feuds, plots and storylines. Wrestlers portrayed either heels (referred to as rudos in Mexico, those that portray the "bad guys") or faces (técnicos in Mexico, the "good guy" characters) as they followed a series of tension-building events, which culminated in wrestling matches.

Aftermath
After the main event match, it was announced that Rush El Toro Blanco, La Bestia del Ring, Killer Kross, L.A. Park and Konnan were forming a new group called La Facción Ingobernable (based on Rush's Los Ingobernables group from CMLL).

Results

See also
2019 in professional wrestling

References

2019 in professional wrestling
December 2019 events in Mexico
Guerra de Titanes